D'Vonte Price (born June 2, 1999) is an American football running back who is a free agent. He played college football at Florida International.

Early life and high school
Price grew up in Punta Gorda, Florida and attended Charlotte High School. Over the course of his high school career he rushed for 1,265 yards and scored 23 total touchdowns in 32 games played.

College career
Price played primarily as a backup running back with occasional starts during his first two seasons with the FIU Panthers. As a junior, Price gained 249 yards on 50 carries and caught ten passes for 49 yards. He rushed for 581 yards and four touchdowns on 85 carries in five games during FIU's COVID-19-shortened 2020 season. After considering declaring for the 2021 NFL Draft, Price decided to utilize the extra year of eligibility granted to college athletes who played in the 2020 season due to the coronavirus pandemic and return to FIU for a fifth season. He rushed 128 times for 682 yards and six touchdowns in his final season.

Professional career

Price signed with the Indianapolis Colts as an undrafted free agent on April 30, 2022. He was waived on August 30, 2022 and signed to the practice squad the next day.  On October 15, 2022, He was elevated to the active roster for the Colts week 6 game against the Jaguars, following injuries to starting running backs Jonathan Taylor and Nyheim Hines. He played 2 snaps in his debut, both of which on special teams, and did not register a tackle.

References

External links
FIU Panthers bio

Living people
People from Punta Gorda, Florida
Players of American football from Florida
American football running backs
FIU Panthers football players
Indianapolis Colts players
1999 births